Ivans Ribakovs  (born 1960) is a Latvian politician. He is a member of Harmony and a deputy of the 9th, 10th, 11th and 12th Saeima. He began his current term in parliament on November 4, 2014.

External links
Saeima website
Ivans.Ribakovs.lv

1960 births
Living people
People from Zarasai
Latvian people of Russian descent
National Harmony Party politicians
Social Democratic Party "Harmony" politicians
Deputies of the 8th Saeima
Deputies of the 9th Saeima
Deputies of the 10th Saeima
Deputies of the 11th Saeima
Deputies of the 12th Saeima
Deputies of the 13th Saeima
University of Daugavpils alumni